Wilfred Hilary "Jack" Pickford, ISO (18 April 1904 – 6 July 1971) was an Australian rules footballer who played with Hawthorn and Melbourne in the Victorian Football League (VFL).

Early life
Pickford was born in Mildura to Alfred Pickford and Lillian Mabel Short, but his family moved to Melbourne after his father died in 1909. He attended Swinburne Technical College where he excelled in sports, including captaining the football team.

Football
Pickford played eleven games with Hawthorn in Victorian Football Association (VFA) over the period 1922–1924. In the middle of the 1924 season he transferred to Hawthorn Juniors and played in the losing Grand Final team in the Junior Competition. It was during this period that Pickford started being referred to as "Jack" (presumably derived from the Hollywood star of the time, Jack Pickford).

Pickford rejoined Hawthorn as they entered in VFL competition in 1925. He played in their first ever VFL match and appeared consistently through their first four seasons in the League. He was selected as part of a League representative team in 1927.

In 1929 Pickford transferred to VFA club Brighton where he played for three seasons. In 1932 he joined Melbourne and appeared in two games for them towards the end of the season.

Later life
Pickford graduated from Swinburne Senior Technical College (now Swinburne University of Technology) as a civil engineer in 1938 and later worked for the Civil Aviation Authority. In 1969 he was appointed as Companion of the Imperial Service Order for his work as First Assistant Director-General of Civil Aviation. 

Wilfred Hilary Pickford died while visiting Launceston in Tasmania in July 1971 and was cremated at Springvale Botanical Cemetery.

References

External links 

Jack Pickford's playing statistics (Hawthorn) from The VFA Project
Jack Pickford's playing statistics (Brighton) from The VFA Project
Demonwiki profile

1904 births
1971 deaths
Australian rules footballers from Victoria (Australia)
Hawthorn Football Club (VFA) players
Hawthorn Football Club players
Brighton Football Club players
Melbourne Football Club players
People from Mildura
Swinburne University of Technology alumni
Australian Companions of the Imperial Service Order